Ushshaki is a branch of the Khalwatiyya order of Islamic mysticism, also known as Tasawwuf, founded by Sayyid Hasan Husameddin. Literal translation of his name, Husameddin means the sharp sword of the religion. He was born in 880 A.H. ( 1473 CE) in Bukhara, Uzbekistan. Being the son of a merchant named Hajji Tebaruk, his family lineage extends to Imam Hassan, Caliph Ali, and eventually to the Prophet Muhammed.

He built the foundation of his Islamic knowledge and his mystic education under his father’s supervision. Then, he advanced himself to be a virtuous, well-informed, mature person through the authorized spiritual teacher, called Amir Ahmed Semerkandi, and decided to stay with him to advance in his spiritual path. Due to his perseverance and loyalty in this path, his teacher granted him the khilafetname (the official representation) of the Nurbakhshiyya and Kubrawiyya orders of Islamic mysticism. The death of his father played an important role in his life, and with the help of his dream, he decided to leave the family business to his brother, which was in the eastern city of Erzincan in Turkey.

After the death of his teacher, Amir Ahmed Semerkandi, he officially took on the duty of teaching Islamic knowledge and the Kubrawiyya and Nurbakhshiyya paths. During this time, he gave the prince Murad of the Ottoman Empire the glad tiding of his future crown. After becoming the Sultan, Murad, now known as Murad III, insistently invited Respected Pir to Istanbul after becoming the Sultan. He accepted the invitation and continued his teachings in the holy city Istanbul. Before he became a perfected teacher in Tassawuf he met Ibrahim Ummi-Sinan the founder of the Sinani path. From him he received the khilafet name of the Sinani path, after which Hasan Husameddin Uşşaki founded the Ushshaki path. Although, he was not happy with the attention from the public, with the urge of the Sultan Murad III, He ended up establishing his official Dervish Lodge in Kasımpaşa, Istanbul. He died in Konya at the age of 121 during the return trip from his last pilgrimage to Mecca in 1001 AH (1593 CE). He is currently buried in the Ushshaki dargah, in Kasimpasa.

References

Sufi orders
Khalwati order